The discography of American hard rock band Flyleaf consists of four studio albums, seven extended plays, fifteen singles and twelve music videos.

Albums

Studio albums

Extended plays

Singles

Promotional Singles
"Sorrow"
"Perfect"
"Cassie"
"This Close"
"In the Dark"
"Set Apart This Dream"
"Cage On the Ground"
"Great Love"
"Bury Your Heart"
"Green Heart"
"Something Better"
"Platonic"
"Home"

Other charted songs

Guest appearances

Music videos

Notes

References

Discographies of American artists
Rock music group discographies
Discography
Christian music discographies